Prince Amedeo of Savoy-Aosta, 5th Duke of Aosta (Amedeo Umberto Costantino Giorgio Paolo Elena Maria Fiorenzo Zvonimir di Savoia; 27 September 1943 – 1 June 2021) was a claimant to the headship of the House of Savoy, the family which ruled Italy from 1861 to 1946. Until 7 July 2006, Amedeo was styled Duke of Aosta; on that date he declared himself Duke of Savoy, a title that was disputed between him and his third cousin, Vittorio Emanuele, Prince of Naples, only son of King Umberto II of Italy.

Early life
Amedeo was born at Villa della Cisterna in Florence, the only child of Prince Aimone, Duke of Aosta, formerly designated king of Croatia as Tomislav II, and of Princess Irene of Greece and Denmark through whom he was a great-great-grandson of Queen Victoria.

Only three weeks before Amedeo's birth, Italy had surrendered to the Allies. His father, then king-designate of Croatia, abdicated. Italy's former ally, Germany, thereupon launched a military operation to occupy Italy. The infant Amedeo was arrested by the Nazis along with his mother, aunt, and two cousins, and sent to an internment camp in Hirschegg, Austria.

When Amedeo was only four years old, his father died in exile in Buenos Aires, and he succeeded him as Duke of Aosta, Prince della Cisterna e Belriguardo, Marchese di Voghera, and Count di Ponderano.

Amedeo studied at the Collegio Navale Morosini in Venice and in England. He then attended the Naval Academy in Livorno from which he graduated as an officer in the Italian Navy.

He was an Honorary Companion of the Pennsylvania Commandery of the Military Order of the Loyal Legion of the United States, assigned insignia number 21015, as a great-grandson of Prince Philippe, Count of Paris.

Marriages and family

1st marriage and descendants
On 22 July 1964, at the Igreja Paroquial De São Pedro in Sintra, Portugal, Amedeo married his second cousin, Princess Claude of Orléans (born 11 December 1943). She was the ninth child and fifth daughter of Henri, comte de Paris, Orléanist claimant to the French throne, and of Princess Isabelle of Orléans-Braganza. Amedeo and Claude officially separated 20 July 1976, obtained a civil divorce 26 April 1982, and an ecclesiastical annulment from the Roman Rota 8 January 1987. Amedeo and Claude had three children:
 Princess Bianca of Savoy-Aosta (b. Florence, 2 April 1966), married on 11 September 1988 in San Giustino Valdarno, Giberto, Count Arrivabene-Valenti-Gonzaga (b. Rome, 5 July 1961), son of Leonardo, Count Arrivabene-Valenti-Gonzaga, and Maria delle Grazie Brandolini d'Adda. They have five children:
 Viola Arrivabene-Valenti-Gonzaga (b. Rome, 31 May 1991)
 Vera Arrivabene-Valenti-Gonzaga (b. Samedan, 18 August 1993) who married Count Briano Martinoni Caleppio.
 Mafalda Arrivabene-Valenti-Gonzaga (b. Conegliano Veneto, 27 December 1997)
Maddalena Arrivabene-Valenti-Gonzaga (b. Conegliano Veneto, 24 April 2000)
 Leonardo Arrivabene-Valenti-Gonzaga (b. Conegliano Veneto, 5 October 2001)
 Prince Aimone of Savoy-Aosta (b. Florence, 13 October 1967); married in a civil ceremony on 16 September 2008, Princess Olga of Greece (b. Athens, 17 November 1971), daughter of Prince Michael of Greece and Denmark and Marina Karella. The religious marriage took place on 27 September 2008 at Patmos. They have three children:
 Prince Umberto of Savoy-Aosta (b. Paris, 7 March 2009)
 Prince Amedeo of Savoy-Aosta (b. Paris, 24 May 2011)
 Princess Isabella of Savoy-Aosta (b. Paris, 14 December 2012)
 Princess Mafalda of Savoy-Aosta (b. Florence, 20 September 1969) married firstly on 18 September 1993 in San Giustino Valdarno, Don Alessandro Ruffo di Calabria-Santapau dei Principi di Palazzolo (b. Turin, 4 November 1964, a nephew of Queen Paola of Belgium), son of Don Fabrizio Ruffo di Calabria-Santapau dei Principi di Palazzolo and Maria Vaciago, divorced in 1997 without issue; Mafalda married secondly on 27 April 2001 in London, Nobile Francesco Ferrante Lombardo, 10th Baron Lombardo di San Chirico (b. Milan, 31 January 1968), son of Nobile Carlo Felice Lombardo, 9th Baron Lombardo di San Chirico, and Maria Carla Corteletti They have three children:
 Nob. Anna Lombardo di San Chirico (b. Milan, 11 April 2002)
 Nob. Carlo Lombardo di San Chirico (b. Milan, 28 January 2003)
 Nob. Elena Lombardo di San Chirico (b. Milan, 10 March 2004)

2nd marriage
On 30 March 1987, Amedeo married Silvia Paternò di Spedalotto (b. Palermo, 31 December 1953) in the chapel of Villa Spedalotto in Bagheria, Sicily. She is the daughter of Vincenzo Paternò di Spedalotto, 6th Marchese di Reggiovanni, and of Rosanna Bellardo e Ferraris. Amedeo and Silvia had no children.

Outside of wedlock 
Amedeo had a daughter with Kyara van Ellinkhuizen, born outside of wedlock: 
 Ginevra Maria Gabriella van Ellinkhuizen (b. Milan, 19 March 2006), who was born with Down syndrome. Though before her birth Amedeo had stated that he would immediately recognize her as his child and provide for her welfare, he did not do so and instead firstly asked for DNA paternity testing to be performed in order to assure the filiation, which was done. On 4 August 2006, he legally recognized his daughter. The attendant scandal diminished the stature of the House of Savoy and may have further eroded support for the claim of the Aosta branch among monarchists.

Business activities
Amedeo and his wife Silvia lived in the village of San Rocco near the town of Castiglion Fibocchi in Tuscany (about 15 km northwest of Arezzo). He was involved in various agricultural activities including the production of wine marketed under the name Vini Savoia Aosta.

Since 1997, Amedeo was president of the International Foundation Pro Herbario Mediterraneo. From 2003 to 2006, he was president of the committee responsible for the nature reserve on the island of Vivara.

Dynastic activities
Always close to the head of the Savoy dynasty, ex-King Umberto II, Amedeo was long viewed by Italian royalists as a likely claimant to the throne if Umberto's own son, Vittorio Emanuele, Prince of Naples, failed to live up to monarchist expectations.  When Umberto II died in 1983, however, Amedeo recognised Vittorio Emanuele as Head of the House of Savoy, even accepting the award of the Order of Saints Maurice and Lazarus from him.

On 7 July 2006, Amedeo declared himself to be the Head of the House of Savoy and Duke of Savoy, claiming that in 1971 Vittorio Emanuele had lost his dynastic rights when he married without previously obtaining the permission of Umberto II, authorization which had been required under monarchical law. However, there have been claims that consent could also be granted after the wedding.

In addition, there were disputes over the surname used by Amedeo. In 2009, Vittorio Emanuele and his son, Emanuele Filiberto, Prince of Venice, sought judicial intervention to forbid Amedeo's use of the surname di Savoia. In February 2010, the court of Arezzo ruled that the Amedeo and his son Aimone must pay damages totalling 50,000 euros to their cousins and cease using the surname di Savoia instead of di Savoia-Aosta. Amedeo's claim received the support of Vittorio Emanuele's sister, Princess Maria Gabriella of Savoy. However, the verdict was overturned on appeal, with the court of second resort allowing Amedeo the use of the short surname, in the form of di Savoia, and additionally revoking the financial penalty originally imposed on him.

Although many monarchists transferred their allegiance to Amedeo at some point after King Umberto's death, Amedeo was criticized by other Italian royalists who continue to support Prince Vittorio Emanuele. Sergio Pellecchi, President of the Giunta of the Chivalric Orders of the House of Savoy, has stated that the Council of the Senators of the Kingdom was dissolved in 2002 and that it never had any authority in matters of the succession. Eugenio Armando Dondero, spokesman for the Coordinamento Monarchico Italiano, has asked why Amedeo did not claim to be head of the House of Savoy in 1983 when Umberto II died. But others, including constitutional jurist Guido Locatello, declared the marriage of Vittorio Emanuele to be in violation of Savoy dynastic law years before scandal evoked any clamor for Amedeo to replace him. The Unione Monarchica Italiana published in its newsletter, Monarchia Nuova, on 12 February 1987 that the Prince of Naples' marriage to Marina Doria violated the decree of Victor Amadeus III, issued 13 September 1780, regulating the marriages of princes of the blood royal, compelling the Unione to recognise Amedeo as rightful head of the royal house—although at that time Aosta had put forth no public dynastic claim.

Amedeo was a Knight of the Supreme Order of the Most Holy Annunciation named by Umberto II, a Grand Cross of the Order of Saints Maurice and Lazarus named by his cousin Vittorio Emanuele, and a Knight of Honor and Devotion of the Sovereign Military Order of St. John of Jerusalem. He was an honorary citizen of the towns of Marigliano, Pantelleria, and Abetone.  Along with his claim to be Head of the House of Savoy, Amedeo also claimed to be Grand Master of all the house orders.

Death
Prince Amedeo died on 1 June 2021, at the age of 77, in Arezzo, Italy, from cardiac arrest after undergoing surgery on 27 May.

Ancestors

References

External links

 Vini Savoia Aosta
 Interview with Corriere della Sera

1943 births
2021 deaths
Nobility from Florence
Amedeo III
Pretenders to the Italian throne
Italian princes
Italian Roman Catholics
Heirs apparent who never acceded
Italian people of Danish descent
Italian people of Greek descent
Knights of Malta
Knights Grand Cross of the Order of Saints Maurice and Lazarus
Burials at the Basilica of Superga
Sons of kings